Alfredo Hoyos, M.D is a Colombian plastic surgeon who created High-definition liposuction and other advanced body contouring techniques in plastic surgery. He specializes in Plastic Surgery, Aesthetic Plastic Surgery, Maxillofacial surgery, and Hand Surgery. He is also a medical illustrator, painter and sculptor. Dr. Hoyos is featured as a speaker of different companies of the most innovative technologies in the field, not only in Colombia., his natal country, also worldwide. He is also featured in the Aesthetics & Beauty Magazine. Chief and creator of TOTAL DEFINER brand that is an integral programs that show surgeons in the different scenarios of the medical field, how optimize their practice and their team. “THE MOST COMPLETE GUIDE FOR PLASTIC SURGEONS”

Early life and education
Born on March 26, 1972 in Bogota Colombia, Dr. Alfredo Hoyos had  his bachelor's degree education in School Mayor Del Rosario, Colombia and his M.D in Del Rosario University Colombia. He completed visiting fellowships in Aesthetic surgery at New York University, New York City. He did same for Maxillofacial surgery at Mount Sinai Hospital, New York, and  also for Facial Aesthetic surgery at Manhattan Eye, Ear and Throat Hospital, New York.

Plastic surgery career
Dr. Alfredo Hoyos combines his plastic surgery techniques with different technologies, such as Ultrasound-assisted VASER, Bodytite, Microaire, Wells Johnson, Renuvion  to get the best results in liposculpture. He invented the High Definition Liposculpture (HDL), known today as H4D LIPO, Lipo HD and Dynamic Definition at Lipoplasty (4D) as well as other advanced techniques that focus on body contouring. as EVE Technique ( Tummy tuck and Mini Tummy tuck High Def ). He has also refined techniques in fat transfer (Buttock and Pectoral Lipograft) and breast augmentation. Dr. Hoyos alongside his colleagues has performed  several High Def Lipo procedures with consistent results.  He continues to refine these techniques while researching and developing new applications of HD in additional anatomical regions and the field of cosmetic surgery. He has performed plastic surgeries for  many celebrities including Belinda Peregrín.

Dr. Hoyos is the author of books and several scientific articles that discuss innovations and new technologies that work on body contour. Author of High Definition Body Sculpting: Art and Advanced Lipoplasty Techniques in which he reveals details of his techniques and new technologies in body contouring. He travels to share his knowledge with cosmetic surgeons and also serves as a consultant for media and non-scientific magazines.

Dr Hoyos has extensive experience as lecturer and trainer for Vaser, Bodytite, Microaire and other different technologies. He has trained hundreds of plastic surgery physicians in the Liposculpture procedures. Among his trainees include: Dr. Anthony Lockwood of Charleswood Clinic, Canada, Dr. Aguirre of Aguiire Specialist Care, Denver, Dr. Cynthia M. Lopez, Dr. Pazmino, Dr. Sam Sukkar of Houston Texas, and Dr.  Shapiro, Dr. Emmanuel de la Cruz, Dr. Hossam Tahseen, Dr. Augusto Pupio, Dr Felipe Massignan,

Certifications
 Colombian Society of Plastic Surgery, (SCCP).
 International Confederation of Plastic Reconstructive and Aesthetic Surgery (IPRAS).
He is a member of the American Society for Aesthetic Plastic Surgery (ASAPS)
He is a member of the International Society of Aesthetic Plastic Surgery (ISAPS)
He is a member of the American Society of Plastic Surgeons (ASPS)
He is a member of the International Federation for Adipose Therapeutics and Science (IFATS)

See also
 High-definition liposuction
 Liposuction
 Plastic surgery

Awards 

 
 The Brazilian Plastic Surgery Association 2019 Honorable Mention for his numerous and valuable contribution to Worldwide Plastic Surgery field
Ted Lockwood Award (Excellence in Body Contouring) 2019 by ASAPS
SAPS Award 2018  for his great contributions to the Worldwide Plastic Surgery field
 ISCG Award 2014 for his Outstanding contribution to Cosmetic Surgery
 New Economy Award 2014 for his High Definition Liposculpture Technique
 Cutting Edge Award 2014 for his innovative video about High Definition Lipo procedure
 RIYADH, SAUDI ARABIA 2014 Mention for his Outstanding contribution to the Plastic Surgery field

References

External links
 
High Definition Lipo Blog

1972 births
Colombian plastic surgeons
Living people